Harold David Goldsmith (born Hans Goldschmidt), known as Hal (July 20, 1930 – March 13, 2004) was an American Olympic foil and epee fencer.

Early and personal life
Goldsmith was born in Gensungen, Felsberg, Hessen, Germany, and was Jewish. In 1938 when he was eight years old, his family fled Germany and immigrated to Manhattan. He attended Stuyvesant High School. He served as an officer in the United States Army.

In 1956 he married DelRene Millner and had sons John and Bob. In 1964 they moved to Ardsley, New York, and in 1991 they moved to Chilmark, Massachusetts.

Fencing career
Goldsmith fenced for the Fencers Club in New York. He attended The City College of New York. Goldsmith won the 1952 NCAA (National Collegiate Athletic Association) foil championship.  He was inducted into the CCNY Athletic Hall of Fame in 1970.

He won the individual gold medal in foil in the 1955 Pan American Games and 1959 Pan American Games, and a team gold medal in foil in 1959. Goldsmith also won silver medals in both team foil and team epee in 1955.

Goldsmith was a member of three Olympic fencing teams, competing for the United States in 1952 in Helsinki, in 1956 in Melbourne, and in 1960 in Rome. The entire USA Foil Fencing Team at the 1956 Olympics was Jewish, with the other Jewish fencers being Daniel Bukantz, Albert Axelrod, Nathaniel Lubell, and Byron Krieger.

At the US National Championships, Goldsmith won medals in 1952, 1957, and 1960.

Hal Goldsmith died in New York City at the age of 73.

References

External links
Jews in Sports bio

1930 births
2004 deaths
German emigrants to the United States
Sportspeople from Manhattan
People from Ardsley, New York
People from Chilmark, Massachusetts
Stuyvesant High School alumni
CCNY Beavers fencers
American male foil fencers
American male épée fencers
Jewish male épée fencers
Jewish male foil fencers
Jewish American sportspeople
Fencers at the 1952 Summer Olympics
Fencers at the 1956 Summer Olympics
Fencers at the 1960 Summer Olympics
Olympic fencers of the United States
American people of German-Jewish descent
Pan American Games gold medalists for the United States
Pan American Games silver medalists for the United States
Pan American Games medalists in fencing
Fencers at the 1951 Pan American Games
Fencers at the 1955 Pan American Games
20th-century American Jews
21st-century American Jews
Medalists at the 1951 Pan American Games
Medalists at the 1955 Pan American Games